Darrell Leonard is an American, Los Angeles-based, trumpet player, composer and arranger.

He recorded and toured with Delaney and Bonnie and Friends from 1970 through 1973.

He is a Grammy Award winner for his work with Taj Mahal and the Phantom Blues Band.

His work has been featured on recordings by Taj Mahal, Stevie Ray Vaughan, Buddy Guy, Keb' Mo, B. B. King, The Rolling Stones, Bonnie Raitt, Jimmy Smith, Percy Sledge, Barry Goldberg, and Glenn Frey.

His compositions have been featured in the film The Divine Secrets of the Ya Ya Sisterhood and the Eric Simonson play Carter's Way.

References
Grammy Awards 2000
Official Website

"Carter's Way" at Steppenwolfe Theatre

External links
Darrell Leonard Interview NAMM Oral History Library (2021)

Year of birth missing (living people)
Living people
American trumpeters
American male trumpeters
Delaney & Bonnie & Friends members
21st-century trumpeters
21st-century American male musicians